Bernice Mary Stegers (born 12 July 1949) is an English actress. She is known for her roles on television, as well as the horror films Macabre (1980) and Xtro (1982).

Filmography

Film

Television

Video games

Select stage credits

References

External links

1949 births
Actresses from Liverpool
English film actresses
English stage actresses
English television actresses
Living people